Viktor Alekseyevich Zubkov (24 April 1937 – 16 October 2016) was a Soviet professional basketball player and coach. He is considered to be one of the most distinguished players of Soviet and European basketball in the 1950s and 1960s. 

He won two silver medals at the Summer Olympic Games, while representing the senior men's Soviet national team. He was named one of FIBA's 50 Greatest Players in 1991.

Club playing career
Zubkov played at the club level with CSKA Moscow, with whom he won 8 Soviet national league titles (1959–1966), and two FIBA European Champions Cup (EuroLeague) titles (1961 and 1963).

National team career
As a member of the senior men's Soviet national team for seven years (1956–1963), he won two Olympic silver medals (1956 and 1960), one FIBA World Cup bronze medal, in 1963 (in which he was also the team captain), and three EuroBasket gold medals (1957, 1959, and 1961).

Post-playing career
Zubkov retired from playing basketball in 1966, and after that, he worked as senior instructor and deputy chief of the military-engineering academy, named after Valerian Kuybyshev, and as the head coach of the senior Mozambican national team.

he dien on 16 october 2016

References

External links
 FIBA Profile
 FIBA Europe Profile
 Olympics Profile
 Russian Language Profile 

1937 births
2016 deaths
Basketball players at the 1956 Summer Olympics
Basketball players at the 1960 Summer Olympics
Centers (basketball)
FIBA EuroBasket-winning players
Medalists at the 1956 Summer Olympics
Medalists at the 1960 Summer Olympics
Olympic basketball players of the Soviet Union
Olympic medalists in basketball
Olympic silver medalists for the Soviet Union
PBC CSKA Moscow players
Russian basketball coaches
Russian men's basketball players
Soviet basketball coaches
Soviet men's basketball players
1959 FIBA World Championship players
1963 FIBA World Championship players
Sportspeople from Rostov-on-Don
Soviet expatriate sportspeople in Mozambique